A prepper engages in survivalism, a movement who actively prepare for emergencies, including possible disruptions in social or political order.

Prepper may also refer to:

 Preppers (TV series), 2021 Australian TV series
 Preppers, the sports team of MMI Preparatory School, Freeland, Pennsylvania, U.S

See also
 
 Prep (disambiguation)
 Preppie (disambiguation)
 Preparatory school (disambiguation)
 Everyday carry, a collection of useful items that are consistently carried on person every day
 Preppy or preppie, an American subculture associated with old private Northeastern college preparatory schools
 Doomsday Preppers, an American TV show